Michelmore or Mitchelmore is a surname. People with that name include:

 Andrew Michelmore, Australian lightweight rower who won a gold medal at the 1974 World Rowing Championships in Lucerne 
 Christopher Mitchelmore (born 1985), Canadian politician
 Cliff Michelmore (1919–2016), English television presenter and producer
Godwin Michelmore (1894–1982), British army officer
 Guy Michelmore, English film/TV composer and former television news presenter, son of Cliff Michelmore
Janet Hailes Michelmore, Australian women's health educator
 Laurence Michelmore (1909–1997), UNRWA Commissioner-General 1964–1971

See also
 
 Mitchell (surname)
 Macklemore

Surnames
Surnames of English origin
Surnames of British Isles origin
English-language surnames